"Closure" is the debut single by English rapper Cadet, released on 13 April 2018. The song peaked at number 74 on the UK Singles Chart. It has since amassed over 10 million views on YouTube.

Track listing

Charts

References

2018 songs
2018 debut singles
Cadet (rapper) songs